Dejan Vinčić (born 15 September 1986) is a Slovenian volleyball player who plays for the German club VfB Friedrichshafen and the Slovenian national team. With Slovenia, he was the runner-up of the European Volleyball Championship three times, in 2015, 2019 and 2021.

Career
In August 2015, Vinčić was part of the Slovenian national team that won a gold medal in the 2015 European League. He received two individual awards for the Best Setter and the Most Valuable Player. Vinčić was also part of the Slovenian team that won a silver medal at the 2015 European Championship (lost 3–0 to France in the final).

In May 2017 he moved to Cerrad Czarni Radom.

Sporting achievements

Club
 2004–05  Slovenian Championship, with Šoštanj Topolšica
 2007–08  Slovenian Championship, with Salonit Anhovo
 2008–09  Slovenian Cup, with ACH Volley
 2008–09  Slovenian Championship, with ACH Volley
 2009–10  Slovenian Cup, with ACH Volley
 2009–10  Slovenian Championship, with ACH Volley
 2010–11  Slovenian Cup, with ACH Volley
 2010–11  Slovenian Championship, with ACH Volley
 2011–12  Slovenian Cup, with ACH Volley
 2011–12  Slovenian Championship, with ACH Volley
 2012–13  Polish SuperCup, with PGE Skra Bełchatów
 2016–17  Turkish Championship, with Halkbank Ankara

Individual awards
 2015: European League – Best Setter
 2015: European League – Most Valuable Player

References

External links
 
 Player profile at PlusLiga.pl 
 Player profile at Volleybox.net

1986 births
Living people
Sportspeople from Slovenj Gradec
Slovenian men's volleyball players
Mediterranean Games medalists in volleyball
Mediterranean Games bronze medalists for Slovenia
Competitors at the 2009 Mediterranean Games
Slovenian expatriate sportspeople in Poland
Expatriate volleyball players in Poland
Slovenian expatriate sportspeople in Turkey
Expatriate volleyball players in Turkey
Slovenian expatriate sportspeople in France
Expatriate volleyball players in France
Slovenian expatriate sportspeople in Russia
Expatriate volleyball players in Russia
Slovenian expatriate sportspeople in Germany
Expatriate volleyball players in Germany
Skra Bełchatów players
Halkbank volleyball players
Czarni Radom players
Setters (volleyball)